DCC Racing, also known as Diversified Custom Concepts Racing, is an American stock car racing team that last competed part-time in the NASCAR Camping World Truck Series. The team is currently owned by Brad Means, the son of owner-driver Jimmy Means. The team is also currently partnered with Reaume Brothers Racing, with Dylan Lupton driving for the partnership.

NASCAR Camping World Truck Series

Truck No. 39 history 
On March 17, 2021, Ryan Newman announced on The Dale Jr. Download that he would attempt to make the 2021 Pinty's Truck Race on Dirt with the newly founded team, with sponsorship coming in from Coca-Cola and Aggressive Hydraulics. The team attempted pre-race ceremonies, appearing in practice sessions during the weekend. However, rain that forced the cancellation of the qualifying races meant that the team did not qualify for the race, as they had no owner points from the previous season.

Truck No. 39 results

Reaume Brothers Racing partnership 
On August 27, 2021, the team announced that they would partner with fellow NASCAR Camping World Truck Series team Reaume Brothers Racing to let Dylan Lupton drive the final four races of the season in the No. 34 ride.

References 

American auto racing teams
NASCAR teams